Christina Stojanova is a Canadian media historian and faculty member at the University of Regina. Her work focuses on cultural semiotics in Canadian multicultural cinema, Central and Eastern European media and cinema, inter-war German cinema, and on the works of Jean-Luc Godard.

Career 
She received a Bachelor of Arts in Film and Theatre Studies at the Sofia State Academy for Theatre and Film, in Bulgaria in 1980. In 1982 she received a MFA in Film and Theatre Studies from the same institution. In 1999 she completed a PhD in the Interdisciplinary Doctoral Program in Humanities at Concordia University.

The work of Stojanova is mainly focused on Canadian multicultural cinema, Eastern European cinema and German cinema during the war. She also focuses on topics like theories of propaganda, cinema globalization and the phenomenon of mysticism. As an expert consultant in academic area, she has been recognized internationally. Her work has appeared in Kinema.

She has been teaching as an Associate Professor in the Department of Film at the University of Regina since 2006. She has published several books on the history of cinema. In 2011, her co-edited book with Béla Szabados titled Wittgenstein at the Movies: Cinematic Investigations was published by Lexington Books. In 2013 she published a book titled The Legacies of Jean-Luc Godard (WLU Press) along with Douglas Morrey and Nicole Cote.

In 2016, she curated "The Caligari Project" film series.

Selected works

 Christina Stojanova, Dana Duma, The New Romanian Cinema. Edinburgh University Press, 2019
 
Berlin "Culturescapes" (U of T Press, 2008),
 "Making it Like a Man: Canadian Masculinities" (Wilfrid Laurier U Press, 2008),
 "Eastern European Cinema" (Routledge, USA, 2006),
 "Traditions in World Cinema" (Edinburgh U Press, UK, 2006)
Double Vision: Eastern European Cinema, 1948-1989: The Official Story, KINO, the Russian Cinema Series, I. B. Tauris, Limited, 2005, 
 "Horror International" (Wayne U Press, USA, 2005)
 "Alternative Europe" (Wallflower, UK, 2004)
 "Cinema and Globalization" (Editura Victor, Romania, 2003).
 2013. The Legacies of Jean-Luc Godard (Co-edited with Douglas Morrey, U of Warwick, UK, and Nicole Cote, U of Sherbrooke. WLU Press, Canada, 250 pages).

Awards 
In 2006, Stojanova received the Diploma and Silver Medal from the Bulgarian Ministry of Culture. She was a recipient of the Queen Elizabeth II Diamond Jubilee Medal in 2012.

References 

Living people
Place of birth missing (living people)
Year of birth missing (living people)
Film curators
Canadian film educators
Academic staff of the University of Regina
Concordia University alumni
Media historians
Canadian people of Bulgarian descent
Canadian women curators